The loan-to-value (LTV) ratio is a financial term used by lenders to express the ratio of a loan to the value of an asset purchased. 

In Real estate, the term is commonly used by banks and building societies to represent the ratio of the first mortgage line as a percentage of the total appraised value of real property. The remaining 13% represent the lender's haircut, adding up to 100% and being covered from the borrower's equity. The higher the LTV ratio, the riskier the loan is for a lender.

The valuation of a property is typically determined by an appraiser, but a better measure is an arms-length transaction between a willing buyer and a willing seller. Typically, banks will utilize the lesser of the appraised value and purchase price if the purchase is "recent" (within 1–2 years).

Risk
Loan to value is one of the key risk factors that lenders assess when qualifying borrowers for a mortgage. The risk of default is always at the forefront of lending decisions, and the likelihood of a lender absorbing a loss increases as the amount of equity decreases. Therefore, as the LTV ratio of a loan increases, the qualification guidelines for certain mortgage programs become much more strict. Lenders can require borrowers of high LTV loans to buy mortgage insurance to protect the lender from the buyer's default, which increases the costs of the mortgage.

Low LTV ratios (below 80%) may carry with them lower rates for lower-risk borrowers and allow lenders to consider higher-risk borrowers, such as those with low credit scores, previous late payments in their mortgage history, high debt-to-income ratios, high loan amounts or cash-out requirements, insufficient reserves and/or no income. However, an LTV higher than 80% may carry Mortgage Insurance requirements, which will in turn offer the borrower a lower interest rate.  Higher LTV ratios are primarily reserved for borrowers with higher credit scores and a satisfactory mortgage history. Full financing, or 100% LTV, is reserved for only the most credit-worthy borrowers. The loans with LTV ratios higher than 100% are called underwater mortgages.

Combined loan to value ratio (HTV PSV)
Combined loan to value ratio (CLTV) is the proportion of loans (secured by a property) in relation to its value. The term "combined loan to value" adds additional specificity to the basic loan to value which simply indicates the ratio between one primary loan and the property value. When "combined" is added, it indicates that additional loans on the property have been considered in the calculation of the percentage ratio.

The aggregate principal balance(s) of all mortgages on a property divided by its appraised value or purchase price, whichever is less. Distinguishing CLTV from LTV serves to identify loan scenarios that involve more than one mortgage. The CLTV is 75%.

Combined loan to value is an amount in addition to the Loan to Value, which simply represents the first position mortgage or loan as a percentage of the property's value.

Countries

United States
In the United States, conforming loans that meet Fannie Mae and Freddie Mac underwriting guidelines are limited to an LTV ratio that is less than or equal to 80%. Conforming loans above 80% are allowed but typically require private mortgage insurance. Other over-80% LTV loan options exist as well. The Federal Housing Administration (FHA) insures purchase loans to 96.5% and the United States Department of Veterans Affairs and United States Department of Agriculture guarantee purchase loans to 100%.

Properties with more than one lien, such as a second lien, are subject to combined loan to value (CLTV) criteria. The LTV for the stand-alone seconds and Home Equity Line of Credit would be the loan balance as a percentage of the appraised value. However, in order to measure the riskiness of the borrower, one should look at all outstanding mortgage debt.

Australia
In Australia, the term loan to value ratio (LVR) is used. An LVR of 80% or below is considered to be low risk for standard conforming loans, and 60% and below for a no doc loan or low doc loan. Higher LVRs of up to 95% are available if the loan is mortgage insured. It's also possible to take out a home loan with a 100% LVR, where home buyers aren't required to save up for a deposit. However, due to its risky stance, there are strict requirements for those who wish to take out a 100% LVR home loan such as using a guarantor, also known as a Guarantor home loan.

New Zealand 
In New Zealand, the Reserve Bank has introduced Loan-to-Value restrictions on the banks in order to slow the rapidly growing property market - particularly in Auckland. The LVR restrictions mean that banks are not permitted to make more than 10 percent of their residential mortgage lending to high-LVR (less than 20 percent deposit) owner-occupier borrowers and they must restrict their high-LVR (less than 40 percent deposit) lending to investors to no more than 5 percent of residential mortgage lending.

United Kingdom
In the UK, mortgages with an LTV of up to 125% were quite common in the run-up to the national / global economic problems, but today (November 2011) there are very few mortgages available with an LTV of over 90% - and 75% LTV mortgages are the most common.

See also
Collateral (finance)
Cross-collateralization
Haircut (finance)
Mortgage law
Mortgage loan

References

External links
 Investopedia.com page on loan to value
 Mortgage Lenders ease Rules for Home Buyers in Hun The Wall Street Journal

Credit
Personal finance
Financial ratios
Loans